Pimpala is a closed railway station in Adelaide, South Australia. It was a ground level stopping place during the passenger transport days of this line, and a 1965 reference mentioned that it was no longer used at that date.

The stop is now completely disused, the entire Willunga railway line having been dismantled in 1972, and now replaced by the Coast to Vines Rail Trail. The Pimpala station was on the north side of Pimpala Road where the trail crosses that road in Old Reynella.

References

 Australian Railway Historical Society Bulletin No 336, October 1965

External links
 Adelaide to Willunga railway line, somewhere between Reynella and Morphett Vale, circa 1930.

Disused railway stations in South Australia